Ovidiu Ioan Silaghi (born 12 December 1962) is a Romanian politician. A member of the National Liberal Party (PNL), he became Minister for Small and Medium Enterprises in the second Călin Popescu-Tăriceanu cabinet (April 5, 2007).

Biography
Born in Satu Mare, Satu Mare County, Socialist Republic of Romania, Silaghi graduated in Mechanical engineering from the Transylvania University of Braşov (1987), and later (2004) took a master's degree in Public administration from the Vasile Goldiş University in Arad. From the time of his graduation to 1990 (after the Romanian Revolution), he worked as an engineer in his native city, and soon after opened his own private enterprise. In 1999–2004, he was president of the Satu Mare Chamber of Commerce, Industry and Agriculture.

Silaghi joined the PNL in 1990, and was president of its youth wing section in Satu Mare until 1996, while serving as vice president of the main local section. He had other leadership positions until 2000, ultimately becoming president of the PNL section in 2001–2004, and a delegate to the central leadership body in 2002-2004. Between 2000 and 2004, Silaghi was also a member of the Satu Mare City Council.

In the elections of 2004, Silaghi was elected to the Chamber of Deputies for Satu Mare County, sitting on the Committee for Budget, Finance and Banks (until September 2005), the Committee for Information Technology and Communications (after September 2005), and the Committee for Industries and Services (after February 2007).

He became an observer to the European Parliament in September 2005. On 1 January 2007 he became a Member of the European Parliament for the PNL, part of the Alliance of Liberals and Democrats for Europe, with the accession of Romania to the European Union, before being nominated for a ministerial position in early 2007.

Silaghi is married and has two children.

References

External links
European Parliament profile
European Parliament official photo
 Bio at the Chamber of Deputies site

1962 births
Living people
Transilvania University of Brașov alumni
National Liberal Party (Romania) politicians
People from Satu Mare
Romanian businesspeople
Romanian engineers
National Liberal Party (Romania) MEPs
MEPs for Romania 2007